This is a list of notable people who are from Yukon, Canada, or have spent a large part or formative part of their career in that territory.

A
Jerry Alfred  —  musician

B
 Larry Bagnell — Member of the House of Commons
 Bryon Baltimore — ice hockey player
 Kim Barlow  —  musician
 Doug Bell — former Commissioner of the Yukon
 Pierre Berton — writer
 George Black — former Commissioner of the Yukon and former Speaker of the House of Commons
 Martha Black — former Member of the House of Commons
 Charlotte Selina Bompas — missionary
 William Carpenter Bompas — bishop
 Bev Buckway — curler and politician

C
 Jack Cable — former Commissioner of the Yukon
 George Carmaccg bv   k — Klondike gold co-discoverer
 Kate Carmack — Klondike gold co-discoverer
 Dawson Charlie — Klondike gold co-discoverer
 Ione Christensen — former Senator and former Commissioner of the Yukon
 Dylan Cozens (ice hockey) - professional ice hockey player for the Buffalo Sabres of the NHL

D
 Pat Duncan — former Premier

E
 John Edzerza  —  politician

F
 Dennis Fentie — Premier

G
 Judy Gingell— former Commissioner of the Yukon

H
 Louise Hardy — former Member of the House of Commons
 Todd Hardy — Yukon New Democratic Party leader and former Yukon Leader of the Opposition
 Ted Harrison — artist

J
 Victor Jory — actor

L
 Joseph Ladue — founder of Dawson City
 Daniel Lang — Senator

M
 Skookum Jim Mason — Klondike gold co-discoverer
 Piers McDonald — former Premier
 John Kenneth McKinnon — former Commissioner of the Yukon
 Audrey McLaughlin  — former Member of the House of Commons and former leader of the New Democratic Party
 Arthur Mitchell — Yukon Leader of the Opposition

N
 Erik Nielsen — former Member of the House of Commons and Deputy Prime Minister of Canada

O
 William Ogilvie — surveyor
 John Ostashek — former Premier

P
 Chris Pearson — former Government Leader
 Edward Peghin — Emmy-nominated Producer/Director
 Tahmoh Penikett — actor
 Tony Penikett — former Government Leader/Premier
 Willard Phelps — former Government Leader

R
Jim Robb (painter) — watercolour artist, photographer and author

S
 Sahneuti — Gwichʼin First Nation leader
 Robert W. Service — poet
 Sam Steele — Mountie
 Peter Sturgeon — ice hockey player

V
 Geraldine Van Bibber — former Commissioner of the Yukon

W
 James Morrow Walsh — former Commissioner of the Yukon
 Shane Wilson — antler, horn, ivory and bronze sculptor
 Greg Wiltjer — basketball player